Mjølnerparken is a housing project located between Nørrebro and Bispebjerg S-train station in Nørrebro, Copenhagen.  Approximately 1,225 people live in the area; 83% are either non-Western immigrants or born to immigrants. The majority of the inhabitants are under 18 years old.

In 2022, 37.8% of the inhabitants were neither employed nor in education, 2.39% had been convicted for crime, 70.6% had only primary education or less and the average gross income was 47.9% of that for the regional average. These statistics meant that the district fulfilled enough criteria to be classified as a vulnerable residential area by Danish authorities.

References

Housing estates in Copenhagen